Zwanziger is a German, Austrian, and Ashkenazi Jewish surname. Notable people with the surname include:

Anna Maria Zwanziger (1760–1811), German serial killer
Gustav Adolf Zwanziger (1837–1893), Austrian journalist, botanist, and paleobotanist
Daniel Zwanziger (German Wikipedia) (born 1935), American theoretical physicist
Theo Zwanziger (born 1945), German lawyer and sports official
Ron Zwanziger (born 1954), American entrepreneur

German-language surnames